This is a list of statistics for the 1999 Cricket World Cup.

Team Statistics

Highest team totals 
The following table lists the ten highest team scores during this tournament.

Largest winning margin

By runs

By wickets

By balls remaining

Lowest team totals 
This is a list of completed innings only, low totals in matches with reduced overs are omitted except when the team was all out. Successful run chases in the second innings are not counted.

Smallest winning margin

By runs

By wickets

By balls remaining

Individual statistics

Batting statistics

Most runs 
The top ten highest run scorers (total runs) in the tournament are included in this table.

Highest scores 
This table contains the top ten highest scores of the tournament made by a batsman in a single innings.

Most boundaries

Bowling statistics

Most wickets 
The following table contains the ten leading wicket-takers of the tournament.

Best bowling figures 
This table lists the top ten players with the best bowling figures in the tournament.

Most maidens

Hat-tricks

Fielding statistics

Most dismissals 
This is a list of the wicketkeepers who have made the most dismissals in the tournament.

Most catches 
This is a list of the outfielders who have taken the most catches in the tournament.

Other Statistics

Highest partnerships 
The following tables are lists of the highest partnerships for the tournament.

References

1999 Cricket World Cup
Cricket World Cup statistics